Aaltra is a 2004 Belgian French-language deadpan black comedy film directed and written by Gustave de Kervern and Benoît Delépine. The film won four awards and was nominated for three others.

Plot
Benoit Delepine plays a harassed businessman who, frazzled by commuting to his office, is working from home against company rules. While arguing with a jobbing farmworker (Gustave Kervern), whose tractor is spraying herbicide into his garden he is summoned to the office by his angry bosses. However, his car becomes stuck behind the tractor. The farmworker will not let him pass, resulting in the businessman missing the train and losing his job. Frustrated, he seeks out the farmworker and assaults him.

The two wake up in hospital, having been crushed by a malfunctioning farm machine as they struggled. They are now confined to wheelchairs and both set out for Finland to seek out the eponymous farm machine manufacturer to demand compensation.

Cast
Benoît Delépine as The Employee
Gustave Kervern as The Farm Worker
Michel de Gavre as Farmer
Benoît Poelvoorde as Motocross Spectator
Bouli Lanners as The Finnish singer
Gérard Condejean as The Chinese
Isabelle Delépine as Wife

Accolades

Won
London Film Festival 2004
FIPRESCI Prize - Benoît Delépine and Gustave de Kervern
Puchon International Fantastic Film Festival 2004
Best Actor - Benoît Delépine and Gustave de Kervern
Transilvania International Film Festival 2004
Audience Award - Benoît Delépine and Gustave de Kervern
Joseph Plateau Awards 2005
Best Belgian Actor - Benoît Poelvoorde

Nominations
Copenhagen International Film Festival 2004
Golden Swan Award - Benoît Delépine
Rotterdam International Film Festival 2004
Tiger Award - Benoît Delépine and Gustave de Kervern
Joseph Plateau Awards 2005
Best Belgian Film

References

External links 

2004 films
2000s French-language films
Belgian black comedy films
French black comedy films
Films about paraplegics or quadriplegics
Films directed by Benoît Delépine
Films directed by Gustave Kervern
French comedy road movies
2000s road movies
2004 black comedy films
2004 comedy films
Belgian road movies
2000s French films
Films about disability